George Grey Andrews (17 May 1880–19 January 1952) was a New Zealand yacht designer, builder and racer, engineer, naval officer. He was born in Christchurch, North Canterbury, New Zealand on 17 May 1880.

References

1880 births
1952 deaths
20th-century New Zealand engineers
New Zealand sailors
New Zealand yacht designers